Paleogenetics is the study of the past through the examination of preserved genetic material from the remains of ancient organisms. Emile Zuckerkandl and Linus Pauling introduced the term in 1963, long before the sequencing of DNA, in reference to the possible reconstruction of the corresponding polypeptide sequences of past organisms. The first sequence of ancient DNA, isolated from a museum specimen of the extinct quagga, was published in 1984 by a team led by Allan Wilson.

Paleogeneticists do not recreate actual organisms, but piece together ancient DNA sequences using various analytical methods. Fossils are "the only direct witnesses of extinct species and of evolutionary events" and finding DNA within those fossils exposes tremendously more information about these species, potentially their entire physiology and anatomy.

The most ancient DNA sequence to date was reported in February 2021, from the tooth of a Siberian mammoth frozen for over a million years.

Applications

Evolution
Similar sequences are often found along DNA (and the derived protein polypeptide chains) in different species. This similarity is directly linked to the sequence of the DNA (the genetic material of the organism). Due to the improbability of this being random chance, and its consistency too long to be attributed to convergence by natural selection, these similarities can be plausibly linked to the existence of a common ancestor with common genes. This allows DNA sequences to be compared between species. Comparing an ancient genetic sequence to later or modern ones can be used to determine ancestral relations, while comparing two modern genetic sequences can determine, within error, the time since their last common ancestor.

Human evolution
Using the thigh bone of a Neanderthal female, 63% of the Neanderthal genome was recovered and 3.7 billion bases of DNA were decoded. It showed that Homo neanderthalensis was the closest living relative of Homo sapiens, until the former lineage died out 30,000 years ago. The Neanderthal genome was shown to be within the range of variation of those of anatomically modern humans, although at the far periphery of that range of variation. Paleogenetic analysis also suggests that Neanderthals shared slightly more DNA with chimpanzees than homo sapiens. It was also found that Neanderthals were less genetically diverse than modern humans, which indicates that Homo neanderthalensis grew from a group composed of relatively few individuals. DNA sequences suggest that Homo sapiens first appeared  between about 130,000 and 250,000 years ago in Africa.

Paleogenetics opens up many new possibilities for the study of hominid evolution and dispersion. By analyzing the genomes of hominid remains, their lineage can be traced back to from where they came, or from where they share a common ancestor. The Denisova hominid, a species of hominid found in Siberia from which DNA was able to be extracted, may show signs of having genes that are not found in any Neanderthal nor Homo sapiens genome, possibly representing a new lineage or species of hominid.

Evolution of culture
Looking at DNA can give insight into lifestyles of people of the past. Neandertal DNA shows that they lived in small temporary communities. DNA analysis can also show dietary restrictions and mutations, such as the fact that Homo neanderthalensis was lactose-intolerant.

Archaeology

Ancient disease
Studying DNA of the deceased also allows us to look at the medical history of the human species. By looking back we can discover when certain diseases first appeared and began to afflict humans.

Ötzi
The oldest case of Lyme disease was discovered in the genome on Ötzi the Iceman. Ötzi died around 3,300 B.C., and his remains were discovered frozen in the Eastern Alps in the early 1990s, and his genetic material was analyzed in the 2010s. Genetic remains of the bacterium that causes Lyme disease, Borrelia burgdorferi, were discovered in the body.

Domestication of animals
Not only can past humans be investigated through paleogenetics, but the organisms they had an effect on can also be examined. Through examination of the divergence found in domesticated species such as cattle and the archaeological record from their wild counterparts; the effect of domestication can be studied, which could tell us a lot about the behaviors of the cultures that domesticated them. The genetics of these animals also reveals traits not shown in the paleontological remains, such as certain clues as to the behavior, development, and maturation of these animals. The diversity in genes can also tell where the species were domesticated, and how these domesticates migrated from these locations elsewhere.

Challenges
Ancient remains usually contain only a small fraction of the original DNA of an organism. This is due to the degradation of DNA in dead tissue by biotic and abiotic decay. DNA preservation depends on a number of environmental characteristics, including temperature, humidity, oxygen and sunlight. Remains from regions with high heat and humidity typically contain less intact DNA than those from permafrost or caves, where remains may persist in cold, low oxygen conditions for several hundred thousand years. In addition, DNA degrades much more quickly following excavation of materials, and freshly excavated bone has a much higher chance of containing viable genetic material. After excavation, bone may also become contaminated with modern DNA (i.e. from contact with skin or unsterilized tools), which can create false-positive results.

See also 
 Ancestral reconstruction
 Ancestral sequence reconstruction 
 Ancient DNA
 Ancient pathogen genomics
 Archaeogenetics
 Molecular clock
 Paleobiochemistry
 Paleogenomics
 Paleovirology

References 

Paleogenetics